Henwen, meaning "Old White", is in Welsh legend a sow (female pig) which according to the Welsh Triads gave  birth to Cath Palug, a monstrous cat depicted as combating with either Cai (Sir Kay) or King Arthur of Arthurian Legends.

Triads 
According to the triad "Three Powerful Swineherds of the Isle of Britain", the sow was kept by one Coll, son of Collfrewy, a pigkeeper for Dallwyr Dallben (also spelt Dallweir). The variant Red Book of Hergest (RBH) and White Book of Rhydderch (WBR) texts add that the Dallwyr held a valley named after him, the Glen of Dallwyr in Cornwall. The sow was ready to give birth, but this boded ill for the Isle of Britain, according to prophecy, so she was chased until she plunged into the sea at Penrhyn Awstin in Cornwall. The sow eventually re-emerges on land at Aber Tarogi in Gwent Is-coed (a subdivision of Gwent).

Offspring 
Subsequently at various locales, the sow engenders various creatures as offspring, some bountiful, some baneful. 
  At Wheat Field (Maes Gwenith) in Gwent, a grain of wheat and a bee 
  At Llonion in Pembroke/Dyfed, a grain of barley and a bee (26)/ wheat (26W) / piglet (R=Guest)
  At Lleyn in Arfon, a grain o rye (RBH)
  At the Hill of Cyferthwch in Eryri; a wolf-cub and eaglet
  At Llanfair in Arfon under the Black Rock (Maen Du), a kitten.

The wolf and eagle were adopted by eminent men but "they were both the worse for them". The swineherd took the kitten and cast in into the Menai Strait. Then on the isle of Môn (or Mona, i.e. Anglesey), which is across the strait, the sons of Palug reared the cat which became the Cath Palug.

Analysis 
Don Carleton suggests that the tale of Henwen is an allegorical account of the harrying of a female religious leader across south-west Britain by Arthur.

In popular culture
In The Chronicles of Prydain by Lloyd Alexander, Hen Wen is depicted as a clairvoyant pig kept by Dallben and Coll and looked after by Taran, the young protagonist of the series. Hen Wen also appears in The Black Cauldron (1985), the Walt Disney adaptation of the first two books in Alexander's series.

In The Seven Deadly Sins manga and anime there is a character who is based on Henwen.

Notes

References
(Triads)

  Triads re Arthur p. 457-,Canu y Meirch (Book of Taliesin XXV) p. 175-7 (text) and Vol. 1, p.307- (translation)

External links
 English translation of the Welsh Triads
 Henwen
 Hwch Ddu Gwta (Welsh Wikipedia)

See also
 Twrch Trwyth

Arthurian characters
Mythological pigs
Welsh legendary creatures
Welsh mythology
Pigs in literature